The 1911 Clemson Tigers football team represented Clemson Agricultural College—now known as Clemson University—as a member of the Southern Intercollegiate Athletic Association (SIAA) during the 1911 college football season. Under second-year head coach Frank Dobson, the team compiled an overall record of 3–5 with a mark of 2–4 in SIAA play. Paul Bissell was the team captain.

Schedule

References

Clemson
Clemson Tigers football seasons
Clemson Tigers football